The Expedition of Mostaganem occurred in 1558, when Spanish forces attempted to capture the city of Mostaganem. The expedition was supposed to be a decisive step in the conquest of the Ottoman base of Algiers, but it ended in failure, and has been called a "disaster".

Background
The harbour of Mostaganem had been captured by the Spanish from the Muslims in 1506. The harbour became part of numerous Spanish possessions on the coast of the Maghreb, which had been captured since 1496: Melilla (1496), Mers-el-Kebir (1505), Oran (1509), Bougie (1510), Tripoli (1510), Algiers, Shershell, Dellys, Ténès.

In 1516, Mostaganem was seized by Hayreddin Barbarossa from his base of Algiers. He then strengthened its defences, and the city became a rival of Oran. From 1519, Barbarossa placed himself under the protection of the Ottomans, thereby transforming Mostaganem into an Ottoman dominion.

Previous Spanish expeditions had taken place in 1543 and 1547, which failed as the Spanish forces were repulsed and then pursued in retreat by Turkish and tribal forces.

The expedition of 1558 to retake Mostaganem from the Ottomans followed a string of Ottoman successes in the Mediterranean, especially with the Siege of Tripoli in 1551, and the evacuation of Al-Mahdiyeh by the Spaniards. Concurrently, the corsairs of Barbary were operating from their base in Algiers.

Expedition
In the end, around 12,000 Spanish soldiers were taken prisoner. Count Alcaudete, Governor of Oran, died in the expedition. His son Don Martín de Córdoba, himself future Governor of Oran, was also captured in the disaster and would be imprisoned as a Christian slave in Algiers under the beylerbey Hasan Pasha, until he was exchanged for the huge ransom of 23,000 escudos.

The failure of the expedition of Mostaganem ended attempts at a grand alliance between Spain and Morocco against the common Ottoman enemy.

See also
Expedition to Mostaganem (1543)
Expedition to Mostaganem (1547)

Notes

Mostaganem
Mostaganem
Mostaganem
1558 in the Ottoman Empire
Mostaganem
Mostaganem
Mostaganem
1558 in Africa